Syed Ali Raza Rizvi is a prominent Pakistani Twelver Shia Scholar. He is the president of Majlis e Ulama e Shia (Europe), UK.

Biography
Maulana Syed Ali Raza Rizvi was born on May 5, 1976, in Lahore, Pakistan, but his whole family moved to Birmingham, UK where he was raised. After completing his primary and secondary education, he started earlier religious studies in Birmingham. For higher religious studies he went to Qom, Iran. He studied several years in Qom Seminary and graduated in 1998 with dual Masters in Islamic Studies and Arabic.

Publications
He has written and translated several books. Some of them are:
 Kitab al-Tawhid by Shaykh Saduq (the Book of Divine Unity)
 Introduction to Islam 
 Islamic Laws

References

Twelvers
Living people
1976 births
Pakistani scholars
Pakistani Muslim scholars of Islam